The 2020–21 Liga FPD season, is the 100th season since its establishment.

Managerial changes

Before the start of the season

During the Apertura season

Between the Apertura and Clausura season

During the Clausura season

Apertura

Standings

Clausura

Standings

List of foreign players in the league 
This is a list of foreign players in the 2020–21 season. The following players:

 Have played at least one game for the respective club.
 Have not been capped for the Costa Rica national football team on any level, independently from the birthplace

A new rule was introduced this season, that clubs can have four foreign players per club and can only add a new player if there is an injury or a player is released and it's before the close of the season transfer window.

 (player released during the Apertura season)
 (player released between the Apertura and Clausura seasons)
 (player released during the Clausura season)

References

External links

Liga FPD seasons
Costa Rica
2020–21 in Costa Rican football